The Musée Français de la Carte à Jouer is a museum of playing cards located at  16, rue Auguste Gervais, Issy-les-Moulineaux, a suburb of Paris, France. It is open Wednesdays through Sundays. An admission fee is charged.

The museum was established in 1986 based on the collections of Louis Chardonneret (1849–1935) and Robert Thissen, and since 1997 has occupied its current location in the former Château d'Issy of the Princes of Conti. 

It contains about 9000 objects, including nearly 6500 playing cards, 980 etchings, drawings, and posters, and more than other 1000 objects related to card games. It also presents temporary exhibitions. Other galleries tell the story of Issy-les-Moulineaux and the chateau of the Princes of Conti, the beginnings of aviation, and noted artists associated with Issy (Auguste Rodin, Henri Matisse, and Jean Dubuffet).

The museum won the 1999 European Museum of the Year Award.

See also 
 List of museums in Paris

References 
 Musée Français de la Carte à Jouer - official site
 Universalis entry (French)
 Federal-Hotel description (French)

Museums in Hauts-de-Seine
Amusement museums
Decorative arts museums in France
Playing card organisations
Museums established in 1986
1986 establishments in France
Art museums and galleries in Île-de-France